The Amphitheater of Caligula (Latin : Amphitheatrum Caligulae) was an Roman amphitheater, built during the reign of the emperor Caligula and demolished only a few years after its construction. It was sited on the Campus Martius in Rome, probably near the Saepta Julia, since the inscription mentioning it was just to the north of the Saepta.

Work was begun on the amphitheater between 37 and 41 by Caligula, who wished to give Rome a second stone amphitheater alongside that of Statilius Taurus. Still incomplete on his death, it was abandoned and demolished by Claudius. Around 46, Claudius repaired the Aqua Virgo, damaged by the construction of the amphitheater. His restoration was marked by an inscription on the Arch of Claudius, which formed part of the aqueduct and spanned the Via Lata; this includes the phrase "[…] AQUAE VIRGINIS DISTVRBATOS PER C(AIVM) CAESAREM" (of the Aqua Virgo, damaged by C[aius] Caesar).

See also
 List of Roman amphitheatres

References

Buildings and structures completed in the 1st century
Caligula
Caligula